Semiricinula tongasoa is a species of sea snail, a marine gastropod mollusk, in the family Muricidae, the murex snails or rock snails.

Description
The length of the shell attains 14.4 mm.

Distribution
This species occurs in Madagascar.

References

tongasoa
Gastropods described in 2018